Derrick Baker, professionally known as Bigg D, is an American producer from Miami, Florida.

Biography
Born in Miami, Baker grew up in Carol City, his father a professional musician, and his mother a church pianist. He learned guitar and toured with BeBe & CeCe Winans and Shirley Caesar in the 1980s. He had always wanted to work as a producer, and began producing rap artists such as G-Shorties. He went on to produce for artists such as The Rich Collective, Pitbull, Lil Wayne, Rick Ross, Jay-Z, Jennifer Lopez, and Jamie Foxx.

In 2006 he won the award for 'Songwriter of the Year' with Mariah Carey at the 2006 BMI Urban Music Awards.

Production discography
 Jay Burna - TBA (2015)
"Mood"  
 Dillan Grey - Painted Asylum (2015)
"Talk This Way"  
"Addicted To Crazy"
 Ludacris - Burning Bridges / Ludaversal (2014/2015)
"In My Life" Feat. John Legend 
 4th N Ocean - TBA (2014/2015)
"Peyton Manning" 
"Bussin' It" 
"Mula" 
"Birthday Suit" 
 R Kelly - TBA (2015)
"Special Delivery" 
 Pleasure P - Break Up To Make Up (2014)
"Letter To My Ex"
"Sex Mechanic" 
"Changes"
 Sebastian Mikael - Speechless (2014)
"Last Night" Feat. Wale 
"Forever" 
"Speechless"
"4 U" Feat. Rick Ross 
 B-Smyth (2013/2014)
"Twerkoholic" 
 Bryan J (2013)
"Caught Up" feat. Tyga
 The Rich Collective (2013) "Long Lost But Remembered" (Album)
"M.A." with Richard Clarvit 
 Benzino - (2012)
"Oh What A Night" feat. Stevie J
"How Deep Is Your Love"
 Trina - Back 2 Business (2012)
"Petty" 
 Mack Maine - (2012)
"Celebrate" feat. Lil Wayne & Talib Kweli    
 Chris Brown - F.A.M.E. (2011)
Wet the Bed feat. Ludacris 
 Rick Ross (2011)
"Luxurious" feat. Scotty Boi & Terry Bennett
 Glasses Malone - Beach Cruiser (2009)
"Sun Come Up" feat. T-Pain, Rick Ross & Birdman
 Rick Ross - Deeper Than Rap (2009)
"Murder Mami" feat. Foxy Brown
 Charlie Wilson - Uncle Charlie (2009)
"One Time"
 Git Fresh - (2008)
"Booty Music"
"Booty Music Part 2"
"Tipsy" feat. Rick Ross
 Chris Brown - Exclusive (2007)
"Down feat. Kanye West"
 Jay-Z - American Gangster (2007)
"Hello Brooklyn 2.0 feat. Lil' Wayne"
 Jennifer Lopez - Brave (2007)
"Wrong When Your Gone"
 Playaz Circle - Supply & Demand (2007)
"Outlaw'"
 J. Valentine - Conversation Piece (2007)
"Get With This Pimpin Feat. Snoop Dogg'"
 Mario - Unrealesed track from GO (2007)
"This is For"
 Jamie Foxx - Unpredictable(2005)
"Unpredictable Feat. Ludacris" 
 Bottom of Da Map - "Undisclosed"
"Whats da Bizness"
 Pretty Ricky - "Bluestars" 
"Your Body"
"Grind on Me"
"Get A Little Closer"
"Never Let You Go"
"Juicy"
"Call Me"
"Nothing but a Number"
"Grill 'Em"
"Get You Right"
"Chevy"
"I Want You (Girlfriend)"
"Shorty Be Mine"
"Cant Live Without You"
 Lil Wayne - "Tha Carter II"
"Best Rapper Alive"
 Lil Wayne - Tha Carter III Sessions
"Staring At The World"
 Trick Daddy - "Thug Matrimony" "Back By Thug Demand"
"Lets Go" 
"So High feat. Trey Songz and 8Ball"
Trick Daddy
"Yeah, Yeah, Yeah (Original Version)" Feat. Lil Wayne & DJ Khaled
Pitbull - "M.I.A.M.I."
"Damn It Man" 
Smitty - "Smitty Album"
"Tell Me Feat. Mario & Chris Brown"
"For The Love of Money"
Twista - "The Day After"
"Girl Tonite Feat. Trey Songz"
Mike Jones
"Cuddy Buddy"
8Ball & MJG - "Ridin High"
"Ridin High"
Petey Pablo - "Get Me Out of Jail"
Ball Greezy - "I Still Love You"
Ball Greezy - "Step On Out" feat Snoop Dogg & Lil Duval
Ball Greezy - "I'm in Love"
Missy Elliott - "I'm Better" feat Lamb Litty
Missy Elliott - "I'm Better" Remix feat Lamb Litty, Trina, Eve, & Lil Kim
Ocean & Kung Fu - "MAB"
Lehla Samia  - "Call on Me"
LPB Poody   - "How It Feel"
Pia Mia    - "Whole Thing"
Pia Mia    - "Unwrap Me"
Pia Mia    - "NYE"
Sukihana   - "Everywhere"
Sukihana   - "No One"
Sukihana   - "Yous a Hoe"
Sukihana   - "Ho"
Alexia Jayy   - "Who Raised You"
Alexia Jayy   - "It Aint Easy"
Tyler Watts   - "Pick Up the Phone"

References

External links

https://www.instagram.com/biggdfasho/?hl=en

1972 births
Living people
African-American record producers
American hip hop record producers
Date of birth missing (living people)
Musicians from Miami
People from Carol City, Florida
Southern hip hop musicians
21st-century African-American people
20th-century African-American people